The 2019–20 Total League season, is the 67th season of the first division of the professional basketball in Luxembourg.

On 12 March 2020, the National Federation announced all games since that date would be annulled.
Etzella is the defending champion.

Competition format
The regular season consisted in a double-legged round robin tournament where the six first qualified teams advanced to the group for the title, while the other four teams played for avoiding relegation.

In the second stage, all wins from the regular season count for the standings, while the points are reset. The four first qualified teams in the group for the title, advanced to the playoffs, played in a format of best-of-three-games series.

Teams of the relegation group play twice against themselves and twice against the four first qualified teams of the first stage of the Nationale 2. The two worst teams would be relegated.

Teams

Regular season

League table

Results

Group for the title

League table

Results

Relegation group

League table

Results
Only matches between Total League teams are included.

Playoffs
Quarterfinals are played in a best-of-three format, while semifinals and finals in a best-of-five (1-1-1-1-1) format.

Bracket

Quarter-finals

|}

Semi-finals

|}

Finals

|}

References

External links
Luxembourgish basketball at Eurobasket.com
Total League website at FLBB.com

Luxembourg
Basketball in Luxembourg